Dmytro Dem'yanyuk (born 30 June 1983) is a male high jumper from Ukraine.

He competed at the 2007 World Championships, the 2008 World Indoor Championships, the 2008 Olympic Games and the 2012 Summer Olympics without reaching the final. At the 2010 World Indoor Championships he failed to record a valid jump.  At the 2011 World Championships, he finished in 12th place.

He won high jump at European Team Championship 2011 in Stockholm with new personal best of 2.35 metres.

His father, Oleksiy Demyanyuk, was also a high jumper.

Competition record

1No mark in the final

References

1983 births
Living people
Sportspeople from Lviv
Ukrainian male high jumpers
Athletes (track and field) at the 2008 Summer Olympics
Olympic athletes of Ukraine
Athletes (track and field) at the 2012 Summer Olympics